Abraham Lincoln High School (ALHS) is a California Distinguished public high school located in the Sunset District of San Francisco, California. In 2018, ALHS was ranked #499 and earned a gold medal by U.S. News & World Report, placing it in the top 2% of public high schools nationally.

ALHS offers honors and college prep programs, and offers students the ability to specialize in one of five academic areas: business, digital media design, teaching, and environmental science.

ALHS provides services and special education for severely and non-severely impaired students, including a comprehensive English Language Learner (ELL) program, a Mandarin Secondary Dual Language Pathway, 4 years of Spanish, Mandarin, and Japanese instruction, a GATE pathway for gifted and talented students, a Wellness Center, Peer Resource Program, AVID, Step-to-College, clubs, athletics, and extracurricular activities.

History, location, and facilities 
Abraham Lincoln High School was established on Tuesday, August 27, 1940, accepting approximately 950 students under principal Clyde W. White. Its opening and dedication ceremony was held on September 22, 1940.

ALHS is a "westside" school along with Lowell High School and George Washington High School.

In the center of the Sunset District, ALHS occupies four city blocks demarcated by the intersections of Quintara Street and Santiago Street and 22nd Avenue and 24th Avenue. The school is located near the Sunset Reservoir, which supplies water for the Sunset district and serves as a rectangular, city-block track for physical education, and directly north of McCoppin Square, the Taraval Police Station, and the Parkside branch of the San Francisco Public Library.

A 1938 bond issue, approved by San Francisco voters to address the increasing population in the Western San Francisco area, financed the incorporation of ALHS with a three-story building of 50 classrooms, library, and cafeteria as well as a football field, costing over $750,000 in 1940 (adjusted for 2005 dollars, over $10 million). Additions such as the North and South Gymnasiums, the auditorium, and the "New Building" expansion were completed later.

ALHS has been the beneficiary of the Prop A Bond work for remodeling and renovation. The site has been fully updated for the Americans with Disabilities Act.

In 2020 the San Francisco School Renaming Panel argued that Abraham Lincoln, the school's namesake, had treated Native Americans very poorly, and therefore, the school should no longer have his name. Mayor of San Francisco London Breed criticized the renaming proposal, arguing that there were more important tasks to focus on during the COVID-19 pandemic. A video recording of the meeting does not show that the committee discussed the proposal to rename Lincoln. The school board dropped the plan to rename the school.

Academics and admissions 

Abraham Lincoln High School is a comprehensive school that does not require special applications, testing, or auditions for admission. As with all SFUSD schools, Lincoln's admissions are affected by the "diversity index", which considers factors such as socioeconomic status, academic achievement, parents' educational background, and the API score of the sending school.

For the 2017–2018 school year, ALHS was the second most requested high school in the district, after Lowell. 34% (1,548) of all applicants requested Lowell as a 1st choice, and 19% (868) requested Lincoln.

Traditions 
The school colors are red and gold, and the school mascot is the Mustang.

The school hymn, titled "High on a Hilltop", was written by Lincoln graduate Patricia Cutler Aversano in 1943. 
High on a hilltop, 'mid sand and sea,
Abraham Lincoln, we will honor thee forever.
Thy sons and daughters, however long the trail,
Always will remember thee. Hail! Hail! Hail!

The Bell Game is a 70-year old football tradition between Lincoln and rival Washington High School. The winning school receives the prized bell. Spirit week takes place the week of the Bell Game.

The annual Unity Assembly (formerly Brotherhood and Sisterhood Assembly) is one of the largest events at ALHS. Various clubs perform to celebrate the school's diversity. Unity Assembly began to understand other cultures after a near-fatal school-related shooting, which resulted in a paralyzed teenager over twenty years ago. Unity Assembly is a two-hour assembly presented by extracurricular clubs that promote tolerance and awareness.

Lincoln hosts two seasonal festivals each year: Fall Fest and Spring Fest. During these Fests, clubs hold fundraising activities in the open courtyard.

The Turkey Day game is the city championship football game held annually on Thanksgiving.

In popular culture

The first Star Trek convention in Northern California was held at Lincoln in 1975.

The main entrance of ALHS is portrayed as Elmore Junior High School in the British-American animated sitcom The Amazing World of Gumball.

Extracurricular and community work 
ALHS has over 40 clubs and student organizations, including Mock Trial, Drama and Tech, Improv, Unicef, Chess, GSA (Gender Sexuality Alliance), Surf, Rowing, KPOP, Glee,  JROTC (Color Guard, Drum Corps, Exhibition and Flag and Exhibition Drill Teams), Black Student Union, Korean, Japanese Culture, and FilAm (Filipino American).

ALHS has made charitable contributions and ran charitable campaigns, with annual drives for organizations such as the San Francisco Food Bank and Salvation Army. In 2004, the San Francisco Food Bank recognized ALHS for collecting the most food out of all San Francisco schools. Also, that year, students raised $10,000 in the wake of the 2004 Asian tsunami.

Athletics 

ALHS fields varsity teams in baseball, basketball, cheerleading, cross country, fencing, football, golf, soccer, softball, swimming, tennis, volleyball, and wrestling. ALHS also offers track and field, badminton, softball, weightlifting, and girls' flag football. Additionally, ALHS has several athletic and sports clubs, including archery, cycling, and dragon boat.

Dragon boat team 
Established in 1996, the ALHS co-ed dragon boat team is one of the largest in the Bay Area. The ALHS dragon boat team won the World Championship title at the 11th International Dragon Boat Federation (IDBF) Club Crew World Championship Races in Szeged, Hungary, in July 2018.

Varsity football 

The ALHS Varsity Mustangs are the back-to-back California State Champions for football in 2018 and 2019. On December 15, 2018, the Mustangs defeated visiting Orange Glen High School, the San Diego Section Division V champion, 24–13 in the CIF Division VI state title game at City College of San Francisco. It was the first state title in the school's history in the first-ever state championship game held in San Francisco.

On December 14, 2019, the Mustangs defeated Gardena High School Panthers 35–26 in the Division 7AA state championship at City College of San Francisco.

Demographics 
2016–2017
 2072 students; M/F (56.1/ 43.9)

 2017-2018
 126 Certificated Teachers;

Notable alumni

See also 

San Francisco County high schools

References

External links 

GreatSchools.net Profile – An independent overview of Abraham Lincoln High School with various statistics such as API, test scores, and average class sizes.
SFUSD High School Map Locator – A map of Abraham Lincoln High School compared geographically to other high schools

Public high schools in San Francisco
Sunset District, San Francisco
Educational institutions established in 1940
1940 establishments in California
San Francisco Unified School District schools
Naming controversies